Sergiyevka is a rural locality (a village) in Filippovskoye Rural Settlement, Kirzhachsky District, Vladimir Oblast, Russia. The population was 53 as of 2010. There are 4 streets.

Geography 
Sergiyevka is located on the Sherna River, 17 km west of Kirzhach (the district's administrative centre) by road. Berezhki is the nearest rural locality.

References 

Rural localities in Kirzhachsky District